Cherokee Seaplane Base  is a privately owned, public use seaplane base on Grand Lake o' the Cherokees in Delaware County, Oklahoma. It is located seven nautical miles (8 mi, 13 km) southwest of the central business district of Afton, a city in Ottawa County, Oklahoma.

Facilities and aircraft 
Cherokee Seaplane Base covers an area of 12 acres (5 ha) at an elevation of 739 feet (225 m) above mean sea level. It has two water landing areas, one designated ALL/WAY which measures 10,000 by 800 feet (3,048 x 244 m) and another designated NE/SW is 4,000 by 200 feet (1,219 x 61 m). For the 12-month period ending April 17, 2007, the facility had 1,100 general aviation aircraft operations, an average of 91 per month.

References

External links 
 Cherokee Seaplane Base (4O6) at Oklahoma Aeronautics Commission
 Aerial image as of February 1995 from USGS The National Map
 

Airports in Oklahoma
Buildings and structures in Delaware County, Oklahoma
Seaplane bases in the United States
Transportation in Delaware County, Oklahoma